Mohamad Chatah (7 March 1951 – 27 December 2013) was a Lebanese economist and diplomat.

Biography
Chatah was born in Tripoli, Lebanon. He studied economics at the American University in Beirut and earned a doctorate at the University of Texas in the United States. Then he taught economics at his alma mater, University of Texas.

In 1983 he secured a position with the International Monetary Fund as the deputy to the Executive Director, Dr. Mohamed Finaish. He served as Ambassador to the U.S. from 1997 to 2000. He returned to the IMF in 2001 and stayed until June 2005. Chatah's resignation from the IMF in 2005 coincided with the assassination of former Prime Minister Rafik Hariri on 14 February 2005; he returned to Lebanon as a senior adviser to the newly elected Prime Minister Fouad Siniora in August 2005 and served in the post until July 2008. During the July 2006 war, Chatah appeared on numerous Western news outlets as a public spokesman for the Lebanese government. When asked about the government's role in disarming local armed groups, Chatah said "we are doing it [through] dialogue and persuasion, and trying to reach a point where the state is the sole holder of weapons and the one with the only authority throughout our territory." He also served as vice-governor of the Central Bank of Lebanon.

Chatah was named the Minister of Finance of the 70th Lebanese government in July 2008 and held the position to November 2009. He served as foreign policy adviser to Prime Minister Saad Hariri from November 2009 to January 2011. He was affiliated with the Hariri Future Movement, a Sunni political group, although he officially remained an independent figure in national politics.

Assassination and reactions

At approximately 9:40am on 27 December 2013, a car bomb struck Chatah's convoy in the Central District of Beirut, Lebanon. The bombing killed a total of eight people, among them Chatah, and injured seventy others. The bomb "was estimated to weigh more than 50 kilograms and was placed inside a stolen Honda car." The attack has been described as a political assassination of Chatah.

The US President Barack Obama and the Secretary of State John Kerry condemned the assassination of Chatah and described it as a terrorist attack on 27 December.

Publications
Offshore gas belongs to the Lebanese, so let them see the money
Mohamad Chatah's Blog

See also
 List of assassinated Lebanese politicians

References

External links
Personal blog

1951 births
2013 deaths
People from Tripoli, Lebanon
Lebanese Sunni Muslims
American University of Beirut alumni
University of Texas at Austin College of Liberal Arts alumni
International Monetary Fund people
Ambassadors of Lebanon to the United States
Finance ministers of Lebanon
Syrian civil war spillover in Lebanon
Assassinated Lebanese politicians
Mass murder victims
Deaths by car bomb in Lebanon
Lebanese officials of the United Nations
Future Movement politicians